Marko Dragosavljević (born 24 September 1994) is a Serbian sprint canoer.

He won four silver medals at Canoe Sprint European Championships, three in K-1 200 m and one in K-2 500 m, with Simo Boltić).
At Mediterranean Games he won a gold in K-1 200 m.

When he was junior, he won two medals at the European Junior Championships, gold in K-2 500 m, with Simo Boltić, and silver in K-1 200 m for Serbia.

Marko, nicknamed Mare, is a member of the Zorka Color canoe club in Šabac. He is from Bačka Palanka

External links
Serbian Sensation Creates Shock in Racice

1994 births
Living people
Serbian male canoeists
People from Bačka Palanka
Canoeists at the 2015 European Games
European Games medalists in canoeing
European Games bronze medalists for Serbia
European champions for Serbia
Mediterranean Games gold medalists for Serbia
Mediterranean Games silver medalists for Serbia
Competitors at the 2013 Mediterranean Games
Competitors at the 2018 Mediterranean Games
Mediterranean Games medalists in canoeing
Canoeists at the 2019 European Games